Mayang ( "Mayang Miao Autonomous County", ;  usually referred to as "Mayang County") is an autonomous county of Miao people in Hunan Province, China, it is under the administration of the prefecture-level city of Huaihua.

Mayang is located on the west central margin of Hunan Province, adjacent to Guizhou Province. It borders Bijiang District of Tongren, Guizhou to the west, Fenghuang County to the northwest, Luxi County to the northeast, Chenxi County and Hecheng District of Huaihua to the southeast, and Zhijiang County to the south. The county seat is the town of Gaocun and it has seven towns and 11 townships under its jurisdiction.

Etymology 
Mayang derives its name from Mayangshu, a military garrison established in the year 562 by the Southern Chen dynasty to guard against southern tribes. The Garrison was located at the mouth of Taiping Creek, where the Creek flows into the Chenshui (Jinjiang River) and forms a wide and deep pond called Matan. Seated on the northern bank of the pond, the place was named "Mayang" according to Chinese traditions of naming places.

History

Ancient History 
In 562, the Southern Chen dynasty established Mayangshu at what is now Taipingxi, Lüjiaping Town.

In 620, the Tang Dynasty established Mayang County, with the county seat located in what is now Jiuxian, Huangsang Township.

In 1075, the Song Dynasty incorporated Jinzhou Fort and Zhaoyu County into Mayang County, with the county seat located in what is now Jinhe Town.

Modern History (1949-) 
On September 29, 1949, Mayang was liberated by the People's Liberation Army.

On March 28, 1950, the People's Government of Mayang County was established.

In March 1953, the county seat was relocated to Gaocun Town.

On October 31, 1988, under the approval of the State Council, the county was renamed "Mayang Miao Autonomous County".

Climate

Notable people 

 TENG Daiyuan (1904–1974): The first Minister of Railways of the People's Republic of China; Vice-Chairperson (1949–1965) of the CPPCC National Committee (1964–1974).

References
www.xzqh.org

External links 

 
County-level divisions of Hunan
Huaihua
Miao autonomous counties